Demi-Gods and Semi-Devils is a Chinese television series adapted from Louis Cha's novel of the same title. It was first aired in China on CCTV on 22 December 2003.

Cast

 Hu Jun as Qiao Feng / Xiao Yuanshan (young)
 Jimmy Lin as Duan Yu
 Gao Hu as Xuzhu
 Liu Yifei as Wang Yuyan
 Liu Tao as A'zhu
 Chen Hao as A'zi
 Yang Rui as Zhong Ling
 Jiang Xin as Mu Wanqing
 Tong Chun-chung as Duan Zhengchun
 Xiu Qing as Murong Fu
 Diana Pang as Qin Hongmian
 Ruan Danning as Gan Baobao
 Gao Yuan as Dao Baifeng
 Christy Chung as Kang Min
 Wang Luyao as Mrs. Wang
 Li Yongyong as Ruan Xingzhu
 Ji Chunhua as Duan Yanqing
 Shi Lan as Ye Erniang
 Li Yu as Yue Laosan
 Gao Zhao as Yun Zhonghe
 Shen Junyi as Ding Chunqiu
 Shu Chang as Tianshan Tonglao
 Ma Yuke as You Tanzhi
 Ba Yin as Jiu Mozhi
 Zhang Qian as Xiao Yuanshan (old)
 Ren Wu as Murong Bo
 E Busi as Yelü Hongji
 Sun Jiaolong as Wanyan Aguda
 Lü Shigang as Duan Zhengming
 Zhang Hengping as Chu Wanli
 Liu Liwei as Ba Tianshi
 Ren Zewei as Zhu Danchen
 Zhao Yong as Bao Butong
 Xiu Ge as Feng Bo'e
 Zhang Jizhong as Wang Jiantong
 Xu Wenbin as Wu Changfeng
 Li Jun as Elder Song
 Ma Lun as Bai Shijing
 Ma Yingbo as Ma Dayuan
 Zhang Zhihong as Zhao Qiansun
 Bai Jiancai as Tan Gong
 Li Jingjing as Tan Po
 Wang Wensheng as Shan Zheng
 Bai Ma as Qi Liu
 Wei Zongwan as Zhong Wanchou
 Xu Huanshan as Wuyazi
 Liu Zhongyuan as Su Xinghe
 Xie Yuxin as Li Qiushui
 Hou Yueqiu as Wu Laoda
 Wang Haizhen as Princess Yinchuan (Meng Gu)
 Zha Xi as Kang Guangling
 Yang Niansheng as Xuanci
 Chang Yuping as Xuanku
 Dong Zhichen as Huilun
 Zhou Bingqing as Plum Sword
 Zhou Yujie as Bamboo Sword
 Zheng Shuang as Granny Yu
 Jin Song as Helian Tieshu
 Guo Jun as You Ju
 Ebusi Yonglin as Yelü Hongji

List of featured songs
 Kuanshu (宽恕; Forgiveness), the ending theme song, performed by Faye Wong.
 Yangwang (仰望; Look Up To) performed by Xie Yuxin
 Lian Meiren (莲美人; Lotus Beauty) performed by Tang Can
 Shanchuan Qingge (山川情歌; Love Song of Mountains and Rivers) performed by Xiangnü and Zhao Dadi
 Wo Zhen Wo Ai (我真我爱; I'm True, I Love) performed by Tan Weiwei

External links
 
  Demi-Gods and Semi-Devils on Sina.com

2003 Chinese television series debuts
2003 Chinese television series endings
Works based on Demi-Gods and Semi-Devils
Television series set in the Northern Song
Television series set in the Liao dynasty
Television series set in the Western Xia
Chinese wuxia television series
Mandarin-language television shows
Television shows based on works by Jin Yong